UDP-glucuronic acid dehydrogenase (UDP-4-keto-hexauronic acid decarboxylating) (UDP-GlcUA decarboxylase, ArnADH) is an enzyme with systematic name UDP-glucuronate:NAD+ oxidoreductase (decarboxylating). This enzyme catalyses the following chemical reaction

 UDP-glucuronate + NAD+  UDP-beta-L-threo-pentapyranos-4-ulose + CO2 + NADH + H+

The activity is part of a bifunctional enzyme also performing the reaction of EC 2.1.2.13 (UDP-4-amino-4-deoxy-L-arabinose formyltransferase).

References

External links 
 

EC 1.1.1